Crofton is a census-designated place and planned community in Anne Arundel County, Maryland, United States, located  west of the state capital Annapolis,  south of Baltimore, and  east-northeast of Washington, D.C.  The community was established in 1964 and as of the 2020 census, it had a population of 29,136.

History

Development

This new town and planned community was founded at the same time as Reston, Virginia (April 17, 1964) and Columbia, Maryland (1967). Crofton would be anchored by a community golf course, which later became the Crofton Country Club. Crofton was officially founded in the fall of 1964. The company considered picking an English name for the new town that "sounds well and implies that this is a pleasant place to live." It ended up picking the name "Crofton", named after a small township in Cumberland County, England. The English town was originally called Croft-town, derived from the word "Croft", as the town standing upon the Crofts. Originally an exclusive gated community accused of racial exclusion and requiring a country club membership to purchase a home, Crofton's gates were opened, and eventually removed entirely in 2022.

Crofton pond snakehead fish incident 

Crofton was in the national news in late June and early July 2002 after a fish called the northern snakehead was discovered in a local pond. The infestation was found in water behind the Crofton post office and the adjacent shopping center, across Route 3 from local landmark Lake Louise.

The snakehead species is highly aggressive and voracious.  In order to ensure that the fish were eliminated, in September 2002 the main pond and two nearby ponds were dosed heavily with rotenone and subsequently with potassium permanganate. Six adult snakeheads and more than one thousand juvenile fish were found and destroyed.

Ultimately, the incident initiated a national discussion on invasive species. One comparison case was the mute swan, also an invasive and destructive species of the Chesapeake Bay watershed but, in comparison, quite beautiful, and which garnered support from some environmental and animal rights groups.

Several movies were inspired by this incident. Syfy aired two movies in relation to the snakehead outbreak: in March 2004, a movie called Snakehead Terror was featured, and the movie Frankenfish was aired in June 2004. Ten Pound Films also produced a feature film titled Swarm of the Snakehead which related to this incident. In 2007, a documentary titled Fishzilla: Snakehead Invasion aired on the National Geographic Channel, discussing the ecological damage that the snakeheads found in Crofton have done to surrounding areas.

Geography
The original community of Crofton was built on the Duvall family farm located within a triangle formed by three major roads: Crain Highway (Maryland Route 3) to the northwest, Davidsonville Road (Maryland Route 424) to the northeast, and Defense Highway (Maryland Route 450) to the south.

The Crofton CDP now extends north and east from the triangle, including Crofton Park and reaching northeast as far as St. Stephens Church Road.

The Little Patuxent River borders Crofton on its southwest corner at the intersection of Route 3 and Route 450, providing a buffer between Anne Arundel and Prince Georges counties.

Education

Schools 
Crofton contains a number of public schools, administered by the Anne Arundel County Public Schools system:
 Crofton Elementary School, grades K-5
 Crofton Meadows Elementary School, grades K-5
 Crofton Woods Elementary School, grades K-5
 Nantucket Elementary School, grades K-5

For grades 6–8, students from all four of these elementary schools attend Crofton Middle School in adjacent Gambrills, Maryland.

Older students from Crofton attend Crofton High School, grades 9-12, also in adjacent Gambrills, Maryland.

In response to overcrowding caused by continuing development in Crofton and BRAC realignments, a redistricting proposal was approved for Crofton schools in 2013 and construction began in late 2018 on Crofton High School. A redistricting committee was formed in late 2018. In April 2019, the school board adopted a redistricting plan under which all students from the four local elementary schools will attend the new high school. Kathryn Feuerherd was appointed principal in May 2019. Crofton High School has been opened as of September 2020.

There are also some private preschools in Crofton:
 Beaver Creek Child Care
 Crofton Children's Centre
 Crofton Day School
 Crofton Nursery School
 Creative Garden Nursery School and Kindergarten

Demographics

2010 census data
As of the 2000 census, there were 20,091 people, 7,404 households, and 5,478 families residing in the Crofton census-designated place. There were 7,404 households, out of which 40.9% had children under the age of 18 living with them, 60.9% were married couples living together, 10.0% had a female householder with no husband present, and 26.0% were non-families. 20.1% of all households were made up of individuals, and 3.4% had someone living alone who was 65 years of age or older. The average household size was 2.69 and the average family size was 3.13. In the community the population was spread out, with 28.6% under the age of 18, 6.0% from 18 to 24, 35.6% from 25 to 44, 23.2% from 45 to 64, and 6.5% who were 65 years of age or older. The median age was 35 years. For every 100 females, there were 94.3 males. For every 100 females age 18 and over, there were 90.2 males.

In 2010, Crofton had grown to 27,348, an increase of 36%. The median age remained at 35 years. Of the 10,203 housing units, most were households of families (71.5%) with an average household size of 2.67 people.

Census data show an increase in the percentage of minorities living in Crofton. In 2000, the racial makeup of the community was 90.21% White, 5.13% African American, 0.23% Native American, 2.33% Asian, 0.04% Pacific Islander, 0.60% from other races, and 1.44% from two or more races; Hispanic or Latino of any race were 2.48% of the population.  In the 2010 census, the racial makeup of the community was 79.8% White (−10.4%), 10.3% Black (+5.2%), 4.7% Hispanic (+2.2%), 3.3% two or more races (+1.9%), 4.9% Asian (+2.6%), .1% Native American (+.1%), and 1.4% "some other race".

Population history 
The U.S. Census Bureau has recorded the following populations for the Crofton census-designated place.

Earnings data
Crofton has experienced a 33.99% income growth rate since 2000. This exceeds both the Maryland state average rate (30.24%) and the national average rate (19.17%).

According to a 2007 estimate, the median income for a household in the area was $93,198, and the median income for a family was $101,644. Males had a median income of $56,819 versus $41,229 for females. The per capita income for the area was $33,518. About 2.0% of families and 2.7% of the population were below the poverty line, including 3.0% of those under age 18 and 2.3% of those age 65 or over.

Income has risen since then. Based on the American Community Survey for 2008–2012, median incomes in the area were $104,279 for households and $120,316 for families. The per capita income for the area was $43,452. About 1.9% of families and 3.4% of the population were below the poverty line, including 1.9% of those under age 18 and 3.9% of those age 65 or over.

Governance
The original (old) section of Crofton is a Special Community Benefit District (SCBD) governed by the Board of Directors of the Crofton Civic Association. The Crofton SCBD staff includes a Town Manager, Police, Recreation Coordinator, Maintenance Technician and administrative staff that provide for grounds and park maintenance, public safety, and community recreation programs and events. Town Hall is centrally located in the older section of Crofton, at the corner of Crofton Parkway and Duke of Kent Drive. The structure was built as the sales center for the original Crawford development; it was donated to the community in 1973. Town Hall contains offices for the town manager, other Crofton SCBD staff, and the police department. Newer sections of Crofton area are not incorporated and include several HOAs.

Crime and law enforcement
The Crofton Special Community Benefit District is policed by the Crofton Police Department, which was founded in 1969. The department operates under the Anne Arundel County Charter, aided by the Anne Arundel County Police Department and Sheriff's Office as directed by authority.

Landmarks 
 Katcef Archeological Site – archaeological site with native camp sites ranging from the Paleo-Indian Clovis period to the late Woodland period. It was listed on the National Register of Historic Places in 1991.
 Linthicum Walks – a home built over 200 years ago by Thomas Linthicum III, a member of an influential family in Anne Arundel County. The original grant for the land was to Evan Davis in 1672 and obtained in 1699 by Thomas Linthicum, a Welsh immigrant. It was part of a medium-sized tobacco farm. George Washington stayed here during his travels to and from Annapolis and Philadelphia and his home at Mount Vernon, Virginia. Located next to Crofton Middle School and the new Crofton High School, Linthicum Walks is owned by Anne Arundel County, run by the Department of Recreation and Parks and maintained by the Friends of Linthicum Walks. It was listed on the National Register of Historic Places in 1984.
 White's Hall – birthplace of Johns Hopkins, entrepreneur and philanthropist whose greatest legacy is the funding of Johns Hopkins University. Gerrard Hopkins came to America from England, settling in Crofton in 1660. The historic house – built in the late 1700s – still exists near the corner of Riedel Road and Johns Hopkins Road. It is privately owned but empty.

Notable people 

 Spiro Agnew – Following his resignation as Vice President of the United States, Agnew ran Pathlite, Inc., a consulting firm in Crofton.
 Kyle Beckerman – Major League Soccer player for Real Salt Lake and 2014 World Cup star of the U.S. Team.  Raised in Crofton and attended Crofton Woods Elementary School, Crofton Middle School, and DeMatha High School (in Hyattsville, MD) and Arundel High School in Gambrills, MD.
 Bill Belichick – head coach of the New England Patriots  was raised in Crofton and went to Annapolis High
 Peter Bondra – Hockey player
 Johns Hopkins – businessman involved in the building of the B&O Railroad, founded Johns Hopkins University and Johns Hopkins Hospital
 Chris Kubasik – former president and Chief Operating Officer of Lockheed Martin Corporation, now living in Potomac, MD, was raised in Crofton and went to Arundel High School
 Dick Lahn – Noted environmentalist, founder of the Chesapeake Bay String of Pearls preservation project, co-founder of the National Clean Air Coalition, and Annapolis Sustainable Business Alliance was awarded the Sierra Club Lifetime Achievement Award.
 Charles Thomas McMillen – former Democratic congressman, Rhodes Scholar, and pro basketball player.
 Gheorghe Mureșan – former pro basketball player for the Washington Bullets (1993–1998), holds the record as being the tallest man ever to play in the NBA.
 Edward Snowden – Leaked sensitive government documents regarding mass surveillance. Attended Crofton Woods Elementary School, Crofton Middle School, and Arundel High School for  years.

References

Sources 
 Browne, Joseph L., From Sotweed to Suburbia: A History of the Crofton, Maryland Area, 40th Anniversary version, 1660–1960. Baltimore: Gateway Press, Inc., published by the Crofton Rotary to fund the restoration of Linthicum Walks.

External links
 "Crofton, Maryland", at City-Data.com

Populated places established in 1964
Census-designated places in Maryland
Census-designated places in Anne Arundel County, Maryland
Planned cities in the United States
1964 establishments in Maryland